The blacktip sawbelly (Hoplostethus intermedius) is a small deep-sea fish species belonging to the slimehead family (Trachichthyidae). It is found off southern Australia and New Zealand. It ranges at depths from  where it lives on the continental shelf and continental slope.

References

External links
 Fishes of Australia : Hoplostethus intermedius

blacktip sawbelly
Marine fish of Southern Australia
Fish of New Zealand
Tasman Sea
blacktip sawbelly